Lee Jong-hyuk (born July 31, 1974) is a South Korean actor. After more than a decade of leading and supporting roles on stage, film and television, he gained newfound mainstream popularity through the 2012 romantic comedy series A Gentleman's Dignity.

Filmography

Film

Television series

Television show

Music video

Theater

Discography

Awards and nominations

References

External links

 Lee Jong-hyuk at Big Boss Entertainment
 Lee Jong-hyuk at Dain Entertainment
 
 
 
 

1974 births
IHQ (company) artists
Living people
Male actors from Seoul
South Korean male film actors
South Korean male television actors
South Korean male musical theatre actors
South Korean male stage actors
South Korean male web series actors
Seoul Institute of the Arts alumni